Daniel Houghton (1740–1791) was an Irish explorer and one of the earliest Europeans to travel through the interior of West Africa.

Early life and family
Houghton was born into an Irish military family c. 1740. At the age of 18, he signed up with the 69th Regiment of Foot, in which his father had also served. He was soon promoted to the rank of lieutenant. In 1772, he was stationed in the garrison at Gibraltar, whence his commanding officer General Edward Cornwallis sent the young lieutenant to the court of the Moroccan emperor on a diplomatic mission.

The following years were full of financial hardship for Houghton. In a desperate bid to change his fortune, he accepted the post of engineer at the court of the Nawab of Arcot, but instead of reaching India, his ship abandoned its journey at the island of Gorée off the African coast. Here, Houghton took up the post of Fort-Major, a role in which he continued for the next four years.

After he retired from the army he married and started a family. He married Philippa Evelyn, the great-granddaughter of John Evelyn, the diarist,  at St Martin in the Fields, London, on 12 December 1783. A marriage notice referred to him as "Major of the Garrison of Goree in Africa, and formerly Consul-General to the Emperor of Morocco." They had three children: Charles Evelyn Daniel Francis Houghton, born on 20th September 1784; Frederick Hugh Evelyn Houghton, born on 30th August 1786; and Philippa Maria Houghton, born on 27th July 1788. Prior to his marriage to Philippa. Daniel had been married before. In the Irish National Archives there is a file containing the "Memorial of Monica Kiernan, alias Lawler Lynch and James, George and Cecilia Lawler Lynch of Galway Town, to Viscount Sidmouth, seeking assistance and noting that they are the descendants of the late Maj Daniel Francis Houghton, 69th Regiment of Foot, who discovered the source of the Niger River in Africa; noting that Houghton’s only child, Catherine Cornwallis Houghton, married George Lawler Lynch. Also covering letter from George Lawler Lynch, attorney, 16 George’s Place, [Dublin], seeking a situation in the law department."

African explorer
In 1790, Houghton approached the African Association in London, proposing a mission to travel up the Gambia river and explore the hinterland of Africa's west coast. His optimism, determination and apparent fearlessness worked in his favour, as did his basic knowledge of Arabic and Mandingo. His proposal was accepted by the Association. Houghton's instructions were to sail to the mouth of the Gambia, navigate the river to the Barra Kunda falls, and then to travel overland to the Hausa lands to the east. He was also tasked with pinpointing the exact location of the fabled city of Timbuktu as well as charting the course of the Niger River.

Houghton sailed for Africa in October 1790. He touched down at Barra in present-day Gambia and proceeded to the trading post upriver at Pisania. Thence, via the town of Jonkakonda, he reached the frontier of the kingdom of Wuli in early 1791. Although he was received cordially by the king, Houghton's luck did not hold. The town of Medina, where he was staying, burnt down one day in March 1791, destroying much of Houghton's possessions, including his weapons and valuable navigational equipment. More misfortunes followed, compounded by the outbreak of war between rival kingdoms on the road to Timbuktu.

Nevertheless, Houghton ploughed on, and in May 1791, he left the river/falls at Barra Kunda, pushing off overland in the direction of Timbuktu. As the Association later noted: "He had now passed the former limits of European discovery." He reached the Faleme river, the southern tributary of the Senegal river. The local ruler, however, proved hostile to the newcomer, and Houghton was robbed again. Eventually, he managed to reach the town of Ferbanna in the kingdom of Bambuk in the middle of the rainy season.

He was then approached by a trader called Madegammo who offered to take Houghton to Timbuktu for a fee. They started off on this final stage of the journey in July 1791. Houghton sent his last dispatch to the Pisania trading post in September 1791, from the village of Simbing deep in the interior. He was never heard from again.

Death
In July 1793, reports finally arrived in London confirming that Houghton had died in Africa. As the circumstances were pieced together, it appeared that Houghton had been discouraged from taking the direct route to Timbuktu. He had thus decided to travel through the desert to Tisheet in the north. But two days into the Sahara, Houghton feared that his travelling companions intended to kill him. He turned back south, alone and without any food or water, and made it to a watering-hole called Tarra. The natives camped there refused him any sustenance, and Houghton died there of starvation. His corpse was left unburied to be eaten by scavengers.

References

 Anthony Sattin, The Gates of Africa: Death, Discovery and the Search for Timbuktu, pp. 91–124 (HarperCollins, London, 2003).
 Mungo Park, Travels in the Interior Districts of Africa, Performed in the Years 1795, 1796, and 1797. with an Account of a Subsequent Mission to that Country in 1805., pp. 101–102 (John Murray, London, 1816).

 http://www.bookrags.com/research/daniel-houghton-ued

1740 births
1791 deaths
Irish explorers
Explorers of Africa
18th-century Irish people